The Third Ashok Gehlot ministry is the state cabinet of the Indian state of Rajasthan in the 15th Rajasthan Legislative Assembly headed by Chief Minister Ashok Gehlot.

History

Inauguration 
The results for the 2018 Rajasthan Legislative Assembly election were announced on 11 December 2022. The result was a hung house, with the Indian National Congress falling one seat short of majority. With the help of three parties, the Bahujan Samaj Party, the Bharatiya Tribal Party and the Rashtriya Lok Dal (combined 9 seats) announced their outside support for the Congress party, resulting in the formation of a Congress government in Rajasthan.

On 17 December 2017, Ashok Gehlot took oath as chief minister of Rajasthan for his third term in Jaipur. Sachin Pilot also took oath as deputy chief minister.

2020 Rajasthan political crisis 
On 12 July 2020, around 19 members of the Rajasthan Legislative Assembly, as claimed by the then deputy chief minister of Rajasthan Sachin Pilot, flew to Delhi after disputes over different offices between rival factions of the Rajasthan Pradesh Congress Committee, triggering a month-long political crisis in the state of Rajasthan. The rebel faction led by Sachin Pilot claimed that they had the support of 30 MLAs and can topple the Ashok Gehlot-led Congress government in Rajasthan. He demanded the chief minister's post for which he was denied after the 2018 elections.

The Congress Legislature Party issued a whip to all its MLAs to be present in the meeting which was scheduled to be held at the Chief Minister's House or strict action would be taken against them. Meanwhile, Sachin Pilot reaffirmed that he won't be joining the BJP. By 14 July, with Pilot refusing to back down, Gehlot sacked him from his posts of deputy chief minister of Rajasthan and president of the Rajasthan Pradesh Congress Committee.

On 10th August, the event changed drastically, when Sachin Pilot met with Rahul Gandhi & Priyanka Gandhi. On the same day, rebel MLA Bhanwar Lal Sharma reached Jaipur and met with Chief Minister Ashok Gehlot. Sachin Pilot met Chief Minister Ashok Gehlot and finally, both the factions of the Rajasthan Pradesh Congress Committee reunited.

On 14th August, the political crisis officially ended with Ashok Gehlot-led Congress Government winning the trust vote in the Rajasthan Legislative Assembly through voice vote. All the MLAs of the Congress and its allies were present, although 73 BJP MLAs were not present.

Major decisions

Agriculture 
For the 2022-23 state budget, Ashok Gehlot announced the Rajasthan government launched the Krishak Sathi Yojana. In this scheme, financial assistance would be provided to farmers in case of death during agricultural activities or in case of partial or permanent disability. A separate budget for the agriculture sector was presented by Rajasthan Chief Minister Ashok Gehlot under the budget allocation of Krishi Sathi Yojana was increased to Rs 5000 crore.

Employment 
On 1 April 2022, the government announced that it would increase the days of employment granted by the MGNREGA scheme from 100 to 125 days.

On 9 September 2022, the Congress government in Rajasthan launched the Indira Gandhi Shehari Rojgar Guarantee Yojana (Indira Gandhi Urban Employment Guarantee Scheme), in which those in the age group of 18-60 years residing within the limits urban local bodies would be able to demand at least 100 days of employment in a year. 

The scheme was rolled out with the objective of providing economic support to the poor and needy living in the cities. Poor and destitute people, especially those who lost their livelihood during the pandemic would be given preference to the scheme. The Rajasthan government had allocated ₹800 crore ($97 million) for the scheme, as announced by chief minister Ashok Gehlot in the 2022-23 FYstate budget.

Electricity 
On 1 April 2022, the Rajasthan government announced free electricity up to 50 units to those consuming 100 units per month in Rajasthan. It also said that for all household consumers, the cost of ₹3 per unit for consumption up to 150 units and ₹2 per unit for consumption from 150-300 units will be bourn by the state government. The government claimed that around 1.18 crore (11.8 million) families were expected to benefit from this scheme.

Healthcare 
On 1 April 2022, the government increased the insurance amount under its health insurance scheme Chiranjeevi from ₹5,00,000 to ₹10,00,000. It claimed that it 1.34 crore (13.4 million) families were expected to benefit from this scheme.

Indira Rasoi Scheme 
Launched on 20 August 2020 by Ashok Gehlot in urban areas, the Indira Rasoi Scheme was started with the resolution that no one should sleep hungry. The scheme provides adequate, tasty and nutritious food to the people for only 8 rupees. As of September 2022, hundreds of Indira Rasoi centres have benefited around 5.5 crore people, according to government data.

There are currently 950 Indira Rasoi centres which have served 9 crore (90 million) thalis since 2020. The scheme has been extremely successful.

Old Pension Scheme 
In the 2022-23 FY state budget, the Rajasthan government restored the Old Pension Scheme for government employees who joined the service on or after January 1, 2004 (when the NPS took effect).

Smartphones 
The Rajasthan government launched the Digital Seva Yojana scheme in which women heads of 1.35 crore (13.5 million) families would be given a smartphone with free internet connectivity for three years. The phones would also support the two SIM feature and one SIM will already come activated in its ‘primary slot’, which cannot be changed. The project was estimated to be worth ₹12,000 crore ($1.45 billion) and state owned company Rajcomp is responsible for the implementation of the project.

Council of Ministers

Minister of State

District Wise break up

Former Members

References

Indian National Congress state ministries
Lists of current Indian state and territorial ministries
Cabinets established in 2018
2018 establishments in Rajasthan
Gehlot 03
Rashtriya Lok Dal